Omar Pedro Siles Canda (born 15 November 1992) is a Bolivian footballer who plays as a midfielder for Royal Pari FC.

Club career
Born in Santa Cruz de la Sierra, Siles started it out at Academía Tahuichi before joining Universidad at the age of 14. In July 2013, he joined Guabirá.

On 31 July 2017, Siles was presented at Royal Pari FC and helped the club in their promotion to the Bolivian Primera División. During the 2018 season, he was an ever-present figure as his side finished in an impressive fifth position, qualifying to the 2019 Copa Sudamericana.

References

External links 
 
 

1992 births
Living people
People from Santa Cruz de la Sierra
Bolivian footballers
Association football midfielders
Bolivian Primera División players
Guabirá players